Zachary McCaskie (born 18 November 1996) is a Barbadian cricketer. He made his List A debut on 23 November 2019, for Barbados in the 2019–20 Regional Super50 tournament.

References

External links
 

1996 births
Living people
Barbadian cricketers
Barbados cricketers
Place of birth missing (living people)